Wiremu Mulligan "Bill" Gudgeon is a former New Zealand politician. He is a member of the New Zealand First party.

Early years
Gudgeon is of Ngāti Porou descent and was raised on the East Coast and in the Waikato. He studied at the University of Waikato and the University of Hawaii. Gudgeon served in the New Zealand Army, and was part of deployments in Malaya, Thailand and Borneo. He eventually became a lecturer at Waikato Polytechnic.

Member of Parliament

He was ranked 25th on New Zealand First's party list, which was too low to be elected. He lost his list seat following a large decline in New Zealand First's vote in the 2005 election.

References

Living people
Year of birth missing (living people)
Māori MPs
New Zealand First MPs
New Zealand Army personnel
New Zealand list MPs
Unsuccessful candidates in the 2011 New Zealand general election
Unsuccessful candidates in the 2005 New Zealand general election
Members of the New Zealand House of Representatives
Unsuccessful candidates in the 1999 New Zealand general election
Unsuccessful candidates in the 2014 New Zealand general election
21st-century New Zealand politicians
University of Waikato alumni
Ngāti Porou people